Undress to the Beat is the seventh album by German pop singer Jeanette. It was released by Universal Records on 20 March 2009 in Germany. A limited deluxe edition of the album was also released on March 20, 2009 with a bonus remixes and songs.

Critical reception

Undress to the Beat received negative reviews from pop music critics. In a review for CDStarts.de, Matthias Reichel wrote that the album was an effort to capitalize on the chart success of Kylie Minogue and Lady Gaga by adopting their dance-pop musical style. Furthermore, Reichel called the album unconvincing, rating it four out of ten. LetMeEntertainYou.de described the album as unoriginal, citing its similarities to recent efforts by Britney Spears and Madonna.

Singles
 The album's lead single, "Undress to the Beat", was released on February 27, 2009. The song reached number six on the German singles chart and number twenty on the Austrian singles chart.
 The second single, "Material Boy (Don't Look Back)" was released three months later on May 29, 2009. The song reached number forty-three in German singles chart and number sixty-nine on the Austrian singles chart.
 The third single, "Solitary Rose" was released on October 30, 2009. The song was premiered on her TV series Anna und die Liebe. The song peaked number 15 in Germany.

Track listing

Charts

References

External links
Official website

2009 albums
Jeanette Biedermann albums
Dance-pop albums by German artists